
Year 820 (DCCCXX) was a leap year starting on Sunday (link will display the full calendar) of the Julian calendar.

Events 
 By place 
Abbasid Caliphate 
Abbasid caliph Al-Ma'mun appointed Isa ibn Yazid al-Juludi as Abbasid governor of Yemen for few months.
Caliph Al-Ma'mun appointed Hisn ibn al-Minhal as Abbasid governor of Yemen for few months.
Caliph Al-Ma'mun appointed Ibrahim al-Ifriqi as Abbasid governor of Yemen. He remained in office until 821.
Caliph al-Ma'mun appointed Abu Nasr ibn al-Sari as Abbasid governor of Egypt.

 Byzantine Empire 
 December 25 – Emperor Leo V (the Armenian) is assassinated by conspirators in the Hagia Sophia, at Constantinople. Though unarmed, he fights back fiercely but dies of his wounds. He is succeeded by Michael II, the commander of the palace guard (excubitores). Leo's family (including his mother and his wife Theodosia) are exiled to monasteries in Princes' Islands.

 Ireland 
 Fedelmid mac Crimthainn assumes the kingship as ruler of Munster (modern Ireland).

 China 
 Emperor Xian Zong dies from poisoning (due to medicines), after a 14-year reign. He is succeeded by his son Mu Zong, as ruler of the Tang Dynasty.

Births 
 Adalbert I, Frankish margrave (approximate date)
 Adelaide of Tours, Frankish noblewoman (approximate date)
 Álmos, military leader (gyula) of the Hungarians (approximate date)
 Anandavardhana, Indian philosopher (d. 890)
 Ashot I ("the Great"), king of Armenia (approximate date)
 Buhturi, Syrian poet (d. 897)
 Godfrid Haraldsson, Danish Viking king (approximate date)
 Grimbald, Frankish Benedictine monk (d. 901)
 Hucbert, Frankish nobleman (d. 864)
 Ibn Khordadbeh, Persian geographer (approximate date)
 Qusta ibn Luqa, Syrian Melkite physician (d. 912)
 Ranulf I of Aquitaine, Frankish nobleman (d. 866)
 Rhodri the Great, king of Gwynedd (Wales) (approximate date)

Deaths 
 September 14, Li Yong, chancellor of the Tang Dynasty
 December 25, Leo V, emperor of the Byzantine Empire (b. 775)
 Adi Shankara, Indian philosopher and theologian (b. 788)
 Causantín mac Fergusa, king of the Picts
 Huangfu Bo, chancellor of the Tang Dynasty
 Lupo III, duke of Gascony (approximate date)
 Muhammad ibn Idris al-Shafi‘i, Muslim imam (b. 767)
 Olcobhar mac Cummuscach, abbot of Clonfert
 Song Ruoxin, Chinese scholar and poet (b. 768)
 Tnúthgal mac Donngaile, king of Munster
 Tutu Chengcui, eunuch and advisor of the Tang Dynasty
 Wang Chengzong, general of the Tang Dynasty
 Xian Zong, emperor of the Tang Dynasty (b. 778)

References